Xiao Yao Wan, also known as Free and Easy Wanderer, is a Chinese classic herbal formula. It is commonly made into Chinese patent medicine.

History
Xiao Yao Wan is an ancient Chinese patent medicine with a history of more than 1,000 years.

In the early days, the output of Chinese herbs was not high. In order to control the consumption of Chinese herbs, people ground Chinese herbs into powder.

Formulation
While Xiao Yao Wan formulations vary, the herbs most often combined in Xiao Yao San are:

 Bupleurum (chai hu)
 Dong quai (dang gui)
 White peony root (bai shao)
 White atractylodes (bai zhu)
 Poria (fu ling)
 Peppermint (bo he)
 Quick fried ginger root (pao jian)
 Licorice root (zhi gan cao)

Effects
Studies on Xiao Yao San are limited to animal studies. Nevertheless, XYS has been shown to improve stress and reduce depression.

Traditional Medicine
Xiao Yao San (XYS) has been used for centuries by practitioners of Chinese Traditional Medicine. Practitioners of TCM believe XYS works by clearing liver stagnation to improve the flow of qi (energy). Stagnant liver qi is said to affect the blood and contribute to stress, mood swings, pain, irritability, constipation, abdominal pain, premenstrual syndrome (PMS), and irregular menstrual periods.

Chinese classic herbal formula

See also
Chinese classic herbal formula
Chinese patent medicine

References

External links
Chinese Patent Medicine Xiao Yao Wan

 

Traditional Chinese medicine pills